Aurelio Díaz Cadaveda (born 22 May 1923) was a Spanish welterweight boxer. He was born in Gijón, Asturias, Spain. He made it to the quarter-finals at the 1948 Olympic Games.

References

External links 
Aurelio Díaz's profile at Sports Reference.com

Spanish male boxers
Olympic boxers of Spain
Boxers at the 1948 Summer Olympics
Sportspeople from Gijón
1923 births
Living people
Welterweight boxers